The Sony Xperia C4 is a mid-range Android smartphone developed and manufactured by Sony and it serves as the successor of the Xperia C3. The phone was unveiled on 6 May 2015, and it is marketed as the "Selfie Smartphone". Three months later, Sony unveiled its successor, the Xperia C5 Ultra.

The key features of the phone are the 25 mm 5 megapixel front camera and 1.7 GHz octa-core processor powered by Mediatek  MT6752.

Features

Hardware
The Sony Xperia C4 has a 5.5-inch IPS LCD display, Octa-core 1.7 GHz Cortex-A53 Mediatek MT6752 processor, 2 GB of RAM and 16 GB of internal storage that can be expanded using microSD cards up to 256 GB. The phone has a 2600 mAh Li-Ion battery, 13 MP rear camera with LED flash and 5 MP front-facing camera with auto-focus. It is available in Black, White, Mint colors.

Software
On September 16, 2016, Sony announced that they were beginning the rollout of Android 6.0 Marshmallow to the Xperia C4 and the Xperia C4 Dual.

Reception
In May 2015, Strategy Analytics conducted an independent consumer test to evaluate the quality of the front camera of the device. After the test, the device was claimed to be the "World's best selfie smartphone" and the "Worlds best smartphone for selfies".

Sales
On 26 May 2015, the dual version of the device released in India along with the dual version of the Xperia M4 Aqua.

References

External links
 White Paper
 Official Press Release 
 Official Website

Android (operating system) devices
Sony smartphones
Mobile phones introduced in 2015